Frank T. Schilling (born July 29, 1969) is a Canadian and Paper-Caymanian Internet-investor.

Personal life
Born in Germany, Schilling grew up in Canada and moved to the Cayman Islands  2003 (at the age of  34).

Career
Schilling founded his company Name Administration Inc. in February 2002. The company manages more than 5,000,000 domain names.   
 
In 2003, Schilling financed the Caribbean's first ICANN accredited domain name registrar. He joined as a member of the ICANN business constituency and co-founded the non-profit Internet Commerce Association in 2006.

In 2012, Schilling was revealed by CNET as the financial backer of Uniregistry. In 2019 Uniregistry became a top 10 registrar of domain names across GTLD's and CCTLD's and operates or provides back-end services to 31 top level domain names.

On February 11, 2020 Godaddy announced that it had acquired the assets of Schilling's Name Administration Inc., as well as the Uniregistry registrar, its secondary marketplace and Uniregistry investments in New York based Brandsight.com. Uniregistry's 31 owned and operated and joint venture top-level-domain names and its registry infrastructure were excluded from the transaction.

On September 30, 2021, Tucows announced it had acquired the registry infrastructure from Schilling's UNR for an undisclosed amount.

Schilling maintains an interest in Internet naming and is an active angel investor whose fund has early investments in Triller and was co-founder of fashion and lifestyle brand LXL through which Schilling develops real estate, dining venues and resort condominiums, also under the LXL banner. 

On June 23, 2021, it was announced that Schilling was the developer behind a plan to build the first man-made safe harbor in the Cayman Islands on the island of Cayman Brac.

Personal life 
He has three children.

External links
 CNET: Here comes the greatest Internet landgrab in history

References

1969 births
Living people
20th-century Canadian businesspeople
21st-century Canadian businesspeople
Canadian bloggers
Canadian people of German descent
Canadian chief executives
Canadian computer businesspeople